Hisar E Ishq is a Pakistani television series aired on Urdu 1.

Cast 

 Kiran Haq as Rania
 Humayun Ashraf
 Sana Javed
 Imran Ashraf
 Hajra Khan
 Sohail Asghar
 Rubina Ashraf
 Anoushey Abbasi
 Zaheen Tahira
 Asad Malik
 Mariya Khan
 Farah Nadir

References 
http://www.urdu1.tv/program/program-detail.php?program-id=25#.USKFBB2LDZw

External links 
 / Official Website

Urdu-language television shows
2012 Pakistani television series debuts
Pakistani drama television series
Urdu 1 original programming